68th parallel may refer to:

68th parallel north, a circle of latitude in the Northern Hemisphere
68th parallel south, a circle of latitude in the Southern Hemisphere